Pseudogapping is an ellipsis mechanism that elides most but not all of a non-finite verb phrase; at least one part of the verb phrase remains, which is called the remnant. Pseudogapping occurs in comparative and contrastive contexts, so it appears often after subordinators and coordinators such as if, although, but, than, etc. It is similar to verb phrase ellipsis (VP-ellipsis) insofar as the ellipsis is introduced by an auxiliary verb, and many grammarians take it to be a particular type of VP-ellipsis. The distribution of pseudogapping is more restricted than that of VP-ellipsis, however, and in this regard, it has some traits in common with gapping. But unlike gapping (but like VP-ellipsis), pseudogapping occurs in English but not in closely related languages. The analysis of pseudogapping can vary greatly depending in part on whether the analysis is based in a phrase structure grammar or a dependency grammar. Pseudogapping was first identified, named, and explored by Stump (1977) and has since been studied in detail by Levin (1986) among others, and now enjoys a firm position in the canon of acknowledged ellipsis mechanisms of English.

Basic examples
The following sentences are basic examples of VP-ellipsis and pseudogapping. Each pair draws attention to the similarities and differences across the two closely related ellipsis mechanisms. A smaller font and subscripts are used to mark the elided material, and the antecedent to the ellipsis is bolded:

He drinks milk more often than she does drink milk. - VP-ellipsis
He drinks milk more often than he does drink water. - Pseudogapping

She is working today, but he isn't working today. - VP-ellipsis
She is working today, and he is working tomorrow. - Pseudogapping

Larry might read the short story, but I won't read the short story. - VP-ellipsis
Larry might read the short story, but he won't read the play. - Pseudogapping

The examples show that like VP-ellipsis, the ellipsis of pseudogapping is introduced by an auxiliary verb (be, can, could, have, may, might, should, will, would, etc.). The expression to the immediate right of the "pseudogap"  is the remnant (water, tomorrow, the play). As with the remnants of gapping, the remnant of pseudogapping must stand in contrast to the parallel expression in the antecedent clause, e.g. water must stand in contrast to milk in the first example. If it does not, the attempt at pseudogapping fails, e.g.

 *He drinks milk more often than she does drink milk. - Failed pseudogapping
 *She is working today, and he is working today also. - Failed pseudogapping
 *Larry might read the short story, but she won't read the short story. - Failed pseudogapping

As the asterisk * indicates, these sentences are ungrammatical due to the failed attempts at pseudogapping which occur because the remnant does not stand in contrast to the parallel expression in the antecedent clause.

Further examples
The elided material of pseudogapping need not be continuous. In other words, there can be two gaps, e.g.

She asks you to help more often than she does ask me to help. - Pseudogapping with discontinuous gap
The teachers will require the boys to read, but they won't require the girls to read. - Pseudogapping with discontinuous gap
The boss will assign you to work on Tuesday more readily than he will assign me to work on Wednesday. - Pseudogapping with discontinuous gap

The last of these three examples is of particular interest, since it shows that pseudogapping can leave two remnants, instead of just one.

The examples so far illustrate that pseudogapping is like gapping insofar as the remnants of both ellipsis mechanisms must stand in contrast to the parallel expressions in the antecedent clauses. Another aspect that aligns pseudogapping with gapping is that it must operate forwards; it cannot operate backwards, that is, the gap must follow its filler (= antecedent). This aspect of pseudogapping is unlike VP-ellipsis, which can operate both forwards and backwards, e.g.

 Although he won't consider your proposal, she will consider your proposal. - VP-ellipsis operating backward
 *Although he won't consider mine, he will consider your proposal. - Failed attempt at backward pseudogapping
 He will consider your proposal, although he won't consider mine. - Successful forward pseudogapping

 Although Susan does praise the cat, Fred never praises the cat. - VP-ellipsis operating backward
 *Although he never does praise the cat, Fred always praises the dog. - Failed attempt at backward pseudogapping
 Fred always praises the dog , although he never does praise the cat. - Successful forward pseudogapping

Theoretical analyses
Like many ellipsis mechanisms, pseudogapping challenges theories of syntax. One major difficulty concerns the syntactic status of the elided material. Under normal circumstances, this material often does not qualify as a constituent. Phrase structure grammars that posit the constituent as the fundamental unit of syntax must therefore seek some means of accounting for the fact that the elided material (= the pseudogapped material) does not appear to be a constituent. One widespread account of the phenomenon is to assume movement followed by ellipsis. The remnant is moved out of the encompassing constituent, so that the encompassing constituent can then be elided. The following trees are representative of the movement plus ellipsis approach (the details will vary); they illustrate the second part of the sentence Phil tried to help you, but he didn't me:

A BPS-style (bare phrase structure) tree convention is employed here insofar as the words themselves are used to label the nodes in the tree. The tree on the left illustrates the underlying structure before movement and ellipsis, and the tree on the right shows the actual surface material. The object pronoun me is moved leftward out of the encompassing constituent try to help me, so that this constituent can then be elided - ellipsis here is indicated using the lighter font. Assuming movement first and ellipsis second in this manner, a constituent-based analysis of pseudogapping (and other ellipsis mechanisms) is possible, since the elided material can be viewed as a constituent after all.

An alternative analysis takes the catena as the fundamental unit of syntactic analysis instead of the constituent. The catena is a unit of syntactic analysis that is closely associated with dependency grammars. Any word or any combination of words that is continuous in the vertical dimension with respect to dominance is a catena. In the example, the elided words qualify as a catena in surface syntax, which means movement is not necessary:

The elided words in light gray qualify as a catena (but not a constituent). Thus if the catena is taken as the fundamental unit of syntactic analysis, the analysis of pseudogapping can remain entirely with what is present on the surface.

Notes

References
Ágel, V., Ludwig Eichinger, Hans-Werner Eroms, Peter Hellwig, Hans Heringer, and Hennig Lobin (eds.) 2003/6. Dependency and Valency: An International Handbook of Contemporary Research. Berlin: Walter de Gruyter.
Baltin, M. 2003. The interaction of ellipsis and binding: Implications for the sequencing of Principle A. Natural Language and Linguistic Theory 21, 215–246.
Hoeksema, J. 2006. Pseudogapping: Its syntactic analysis and cumulative effects on its acceptability. Research on Language and Computation 4, 335-352.
Jackendoff, Ray 1971. Gapping and related rules. Linguistic Inquiry 2, 21-35
Jayaseelan, K. A. 1990. Incomplete VP deletion and gapping. Linguistic Analysis 20, 64-81.
Johnson, K. 2001. What VP ellipsis can do, and what it can’t, but not why. In The handbook of contemporary syntactic theory, M. Baltin and C. Collins (eds.), 439–479. Oxford: Blackwell Publishers.
Johnson, K. 2009. Gapping is not (VP) ellipsis. Linguistic Inquiry 40, 2, 289-328.
Kuno, S. 1976. Gapping: A functional analysis. Linguistic Inquiry 7, 300–318.
Hudson, R. 1989. Gapping and grammatical relations. Linguistics 25, 57-94.
Lasnik, H. 1999. Pseudogapping puzzles. In Fragments: Studies in ellipsis and gapping, E. Elabbas and S. Lappin (eds.), 141–174. Oxford: Oxford University Press. [Reprinted in Minimalist investigations in linguistic theory, H. Lasnik, 55-82. London: Routledge, 2003.]
Levin, N. 1986. Main-verb ellipsis in spoken English. New York: Garland.
Osborne, T., M. Putnam, and T. Groß 2012. Catenae: Introducing a novel unit of syntactic analysis. Syntax 15, 4, 354-396.
Osborne, T. 2019. A Dependency Grammar of English: An Introduction and Beyond. Amsterdam: John Benjamins. https://doi.org/10.1075/z.224 
Ross, John 1970. Gapping and the order of constituents. In Progress in linguistics: A collection of papers, M. Bierwisch and K. Heidolph (eds.), 249-259, The Hague: Mouton.
Gregory Stump. 1977. Pseudogapping. Ms., Ohio State University.

See also
Catena (linguistics)
Constituent (linguistics)
Dependency grammar
Ellipsis (linguistics)
Gapping
Phrase structure grammar
Verb phrase
Verb phrase ellipsis

Syntactic relationships
Generative syntax
Syntax